San Baltazar Loxicha Zapotec (Northwestern Pochutla Zapotec) is a Zapotec language spoken in southern Oaxaca, Mexico. It is spoken in the towns of San Baltazar Loxicha and Santa Catarina Loxicha. It is not the same language as the other dialects spoken in towns named Loxicha, but it is in the same branch of Zapotec.

References

Zapotec languages

Oto-Manguean languages
Languages of Mexico